The 1983–84 Louisiana Tech Bulldogs basketball team represented Louisiana Tech University in Ruston, Louisiana for the 1983–84 season. Led by head coach Andy Russo, the Bulldogs played their home games at Thomas Assembly Center in Ruston, Louisiana. After finishing 3rd in the conference regular season standings, Louisiana Tech won the Southland Conference men's basketball tournament to earn a bid to the NCAA tournament. After an opening round win over Fresno State, the team was beaten by eventual National runner-up Houston, 77–69. Louisiana Tech finished the season with a 26–7 record (8–4 Southland).

Roster

Source

Schedule and results

|-
!colspan=9 style=| Regular season

|-
!colspan=9 style=| Southland Conference tournament

|-
!colspan=9 style=| NCAA tournament

References

Louisiana Tech Bulldogs basketball seasons
Louisiana Tech
Louisiana Tech
1983 in sports in Louisiana
1984 in sports in Louisiana